Accipitrum may refer to:
Sparrowhawk
Accipitrum insula, ancient name of San Pietro Island
Accipitrum insula (Red Sea), island in the Red Sea